The 1974–75 San Diego Mariners season was the first season of operation of the San Diego Mariners in the World Hockey Association (WHA). The franchise was formerly named the Jersey Knights and was transferred to San Diego. The Mariners qualified for the playoffs, winning the first round before losing in the second round to the Houston Aeros.

Offseason
After two seasons in the greater New York City area as the New York Raiders, New York Golden Blades and Jersey Knights, the franchise relocated to the city of San Diego, California.

Regular season

Final standings

Game log

Playoffs

San Diego Mariners 4, Toronto Toros 2

Houston Aeros 4, San Diego Mariners 0 - Semifinals

Player stats

Note: Pos = Position; GP = Games played; G = Goals; A = Assists; Pts = Points; +/- = plus/minus; PIM = Penalty minutes; PPG = Power-play goals; SHG = Short-handed goals; GWG = Game-winning goals
      MIN = Minutes played; W = Wins; L = Losses; T = Ties; GA = Goals-against; GAA = Goals-against average; SO = Shutouts;

Awards and records

Transactions

Draft picks
San Diego's draft picks at the 1974 WHA Amateur Draft.

Farm teams

See also
1974–75 WHA season

References

External links

San
San
San Diego Mariners seasons